Tatai Wildlife Sanctuary is a protected area located in southwest Cambodia created in 2016, covering 144,275 hectares. The area is threatened by sand dredging and processing, by the filling-in of water bodies, and by land-grabbing. In 2021, 26,103 hectares (64,502 acres) were cut from the wildlife sanctuary in a PADDD event. Local communities have been displaced into the protected area from nearby areas following the creation of the 246-megawatt Stung Tatai hydropower dam by China National Machinery Industry Corporation in 2014.

Part of the protected area forms part of the Southern Cardamom REDD+ Project (SCRP).

References

External 

 Map of protected areas in Cambodia

Wildlife sanctuaries of Cambodia
Protected areas of Cambodia
Protected areas established in 2016